Hardy Brothers is a specialty retailer and private company of fine jewellery, timepieces and decorative arts in Australia. Its historic products are now highly collectible and are held in state and national collections. It is the only Australian jewellery business to hold a royal warrant and since 1980 until has produced the Melbourne Cup.

History

Hardy Brothers was founded in 1853 by Jeweller John Hardy, an Englishman newly arrived in Sydney, NSW, Australia. In 1855, the business moved to Hunter Street, Sydney, NSW and remained there until 1935. In 1894, the business expanded to Queensland with the opening of a store in Queen Street, Brisbane (now heritage-listed as the Hardy Brothers Building).

A store was opened in Collins Street, Melbourne, in 1918. In 1929, Hardy Brothers were appointed jewellers by royal warrant to His Majesty King George V. The business remained in family control until 1974 and was then taken over in 1980 by Qintex and controlled by that company until 1988. It was then bought by the McKinney family and lastly by Wallace Bishop in 1997. Wallace Bishop is a family owned jewellery company established in 1917 and now run by the fourth generation. Stuart Bishop is the current CEO.

Managing directors

 John Hardy
 Walter Hardy
 Percy Hardy
 Richard Hardy

Chief executives

 Jack Leckie
 Harry Quayle
 Arthur Sims
 John McKinney
 Stuart Bishop

Stores
 189 Edward Street, Brisbane
 60 Castlereagh Street, Sydney
 338 Collins Street, Melbourne
 47 King Street, Perth
 Shop 2707 Pacific Fair Shopping Centre, Gold Coast

See also
List of royal warrant holders of the British royal family

References

External links 
 

Companies based in Brisbane
Retail companies established in 1853
Jewellers
Luxury brands
British Royal Warrant holders
Jewellery retailers of Australia
Jewellery companies of Australia
1853 establishments in Australia